Octav is a 2017 Romanian  drama film directed by Serge Ioan Celebidachi, and produced by Adela Vrinceanu Celebidachi. The title refers to the film's main character. It was selected for the World Cinema section of the Montreal World Film Festival. Octav was the most successful domestic  film at the Romanian box office in 2017.

Synopsis
After returning to his family home with the intention to sell the property, an elderly man becomes haunted by memories of his childhood and his former sweetheart.

Cast

 Marcel Iures as Octav
 Dana Rogoz as Ana (19 years old) 	
 Andi Vasluianu as Marcel
 Maria Obretin as Vera
 Victor Rebengiuc as Spiridon
 Lia Bugnar as Octave's mother
 Ioan Andrei Ionescu as Octave's Father
 Adrian Paduraru as Defense Lawyer
 Stefan Velniciuc as Doctor
 Cristian Bota as Paul (teenager)
 Codin Maticiuc as Property Developer's Assistant
 Camelia Zorlescu as Ana (old)
 Mihai Dinvale as Avram
 Vlad Radescu as Property Developer
 Alexandru Bogdan as Spiridon (teenager)
 Eric Aradits as Octav (child)
 Mircea Constantinescu as Judge 2
 Alessia Tofan as Ana (child)
 Silviu Biris as Mr. Mihailescu
 Mihai Verbintschi as Priest
 Roxana Guttman as Judge 1
 Victor Solomon as Paul (7 years old)
 Monica Ciuta as Mrs. Mihailescu
 Isabella Draghici as Register 1
 Alexandru Mandu as Octave (teenager)
 Alex Harsan as Matei (teenager)
 Dina Rotaru as Register 2
 Andra Illiescu as Nina (child)
 David Bacescu as Matei (child)
 Stelian Soldan as Spiridon (10 years old)
 Tamara Popescu as Judge 3
 Dara Iovitu as Nina (teenager)
 Daniela Voicu as Register 3
 Radu David as Filip
 Dinu Giulio as Stefan (child)

Production
Filming took place from March 21 to April 30, 2016, at Campulung Muscel, Romania and in Cinematographic Studios Bucharest, Buftea.

Box office
The film was the most successful domestic film of 2017 in Romania, with 57,068 admissions and 185,138 EUR / 858,237 RON gross.

References

External links
 

Romanian drama films
2017 films